Loving Proof is the second studio album by American country music artist Ricky Van Shelton. The Singles, "I'll Leave This World Loving You", "From a Jack to a King", and "Living Proof" all reached number one on the charts."Hole In My Pocket" reached number 4. The album was certified platinum by the RIAA on December 20, 1989.

"From a Jack to a King" is a cover of Ned Miller's crossover hit from 1962. "He's Got You" was first performed by Patsy Cline as the opening track on her 1963 album, Sentimentally Yours.

Track listing

Personnel
As listed in liner notes.
Eddie Bayers - drums
Steve Buckingham - backing vocals
Dennis Burnside - piano
Larry Byrom - acoustic guitar
Mark Casstevens - acoustic guitar
Paul Franklin - steel guitar
Steve Gibson - electric guitar
Roy Huskey Jr. - upright bass
Randy McCormick - piano
Farrell Morris - backing vocals
Mark O'Connor - fiddle
Tom Robb - bass guitar
John Wesley Ryles - backing vocals
Ricky Van Shelton - acoustic guitar, lead vocals
Dennis Wilson - backing vocals

Charts

Weekly charts

Year-end charts

Certifications

References

1988 albums
Columbia Records albums
Ricky Van Shelton albums
Albums produced by Steve Buckingham (record producer)